The 1828 United States presidential election in Alabama took place between October 31 and December 2, 1828, as part of the 1828 United States presidential election. Voters chose five representatives, or electors, to the Electoral College, who voted for President and Vice President.

Alabama voted for the Democratic candidate, Andrew Jackson, over the National Republican candidate, John Quincy Adams. Jackson won Alabama by a margin of 79.80%.

Results

See also
United States presidential elections in Alabama

References

Alabama
1828
1828 Alabama elections